South Gyle railway station is a railway station serving South Gyle in the City of Edinburgh, Scotland. It has two platforms. There is a ticket machine and a shelter on each platform.

Edinburgh Park station is also on the edge of South Gyle, which serves the North Clyde Line and the Edinburgh-Dunblane Line. Edinburgh Gateway station is to the north-west of South Gyle.

Services
Monday to Saturday daytimes, two trains per hour go to Edinburgh Waverley eastbound and two trains per hour head towards  and the Fife Circle Line.

Sundays see one train per hour running both clockwise & anticlockwise around the Circle.

References

External links

Railway stations in Edinburgh
Railway stations served by ScotRail
Railway stations in Great Britain opened in 1985
Railway stations opened by British Rail